Volkovija is a mountain village in the Republic of North Macedonia, part of the Municipality of Brvenica.

Geography and location
Situated on the foothills of Suva Gora Mountain and opposite of the biggest mountain in Macedonia, Sar Planina, the village is relatively close to two big cities in Western Macedonia Tetovo (17 km) and Gostivar (8 km). From the capital Skopje, the village is positioned 60 km and takes under an hour to reach it via the main motorway Skopje-Gostivar. There are also daily scheduled buses from Tetovo, connecting locals as well as tourists to the village. It is situated less than 2 km from the river Vardar (Macedonia's biggest river),

Population
Volkovija is a relatively small village holding a population of 270 people. The ethnic composition of the village is Macedonian. 
The village has small primary school “Goce Delcev” which accepts students aged 6–10. The students aged 10–14 continue with the school programs in the neighboring village Stence.

Origins and etymology

The village as such is mentioned for the first time in written text in 1348 (14th century). There are number of interpretations about the origins of the name “Volkovija”. In Macedonian it comes from the word “volk” (wolf) which suggests that in the past the place where today Volkovija is was empty wilderness with many wolves. This however is contested by authors like Viktor Rafajlovski who argues that such a view is illogical mainly because in the past the village area was a home to highly important monastery.

Religion

Volkovija is a home to very important religious heritage for the wider Polog region. This especially applies to the Chuka hill which is believed to be the place of big monastery complex that has been destroyed under the Ottoman rule. Today, religion still plays very important role for the local population which identify with the Macedonian Orthodox Church (Eastern Orthodox). There are 3 churches: Sveti Gorgija (St.George's), Sveti Atanasie (St.Athanasius of Alexandria) and the largest one Sveta Mina (Saint Menas) built in 1936.

Gallery

References

Sources 

Villages in Brvenica Municipality